The 2013–14 Alabama State Hornets basketball team represented Alabama State University during the 2013–14 NCAA Division I men's basketball season. The Hornets, led by ninth year head coach Lewis Jackson, played their home games at the Dunn–Oliver Acadome as members of the Southwestern Athletic Conference. They finished the season 19–13, 12–6 in SWAC play to finish in a tie for second place. They advanced to the semifinals of the SWAC tournament where they lost to Texas Southern. They were invited to the CollegeInsider.com Tournament where they lost in the first round to Sam Houston State.

Season

Preseason
Head coach Lewis Jackson released the team's complete season schedule on September 27, 2013. Road games at Illinois and Bradley as part of the Global Sports Invitational, as well as participation in the Tulane Classic, highlighted the non-conference schedule. Per usual, the SWAC conference slate included one home game and one away game against each of the nine other members of the conference.

November
On November 8, the Hornets traveled to Champaign, Illinois to take on the Illinois Fighting Illini, a participant in the 2013 NCAA tournament. Jamel Waters scored 27 points, nearly half of the Hornets' total (63), but a weak defensive effort by Alabama State allowed the Illini to shoot 44% from the floor and attempt 30 free throws. The Hornets ultimately fell, 63–80. The Hornets continued their brief road trip on the 10th when they went south to Peoria, Illinois to play Missouri Valley Conference member Bradley. Waters led the Hornets again with 14 points, but another poor defensive effort allowed the Braves to shoot 59% from the field while limiting Alabama State to just 38%, leading to an 85–59 victory for Bradley.

The Hornets returned home to the Dunn–Oliver Acadome on November 13 to take on NAIA member Mobile. The Hornets got out to a quick lead that would never be relinquished as they dominated their lower-level foes throughout, en route to an 88–58 victory. The Hornets' next test was a road game against in-state foe Jacksonville State on November 16. The Hornets, who made 32 of 39 free throw attempts, were led by 16 points from Waters. The win increased Alabama State's record to 2–2, while dropping the Gamecocks to 0–4.

Alabama State returned home to the Dunn–Oliver Acadome on November 18 to take on the Cougars of Chicago State. The Cougars defeated the Hornets, 54–67, in Chicago in 2012. Alabama State hit several clutch free throws with 55 seconds left to hold off a 7–0 run by the Cougars to gain the win, 79–75, on the strength of DeMarcus Robinson's 24 points.

December
The Hornets visited nearby Troy, Alabama, on December 7 for their rivalry match-up with Troy. While Robinson added a team-high 19 points, Troy had three 16+ point scorers and rolled to an easy 85–69 victory, revenge for the Hornets' victory in Montgomery in 2012. Alabama State made a quick pit-stop at home on December 16 with a home date against Western Illinois before heading off to the Tulane Classic. Waters had 15 points and six assists to lead the Hornets to a 59–52 win.

Roster

Schedule and results
Source: 

|-
!colspan=8 style="background:#000000; color:#FFD700;"| Exhibition

|-
!colspan=8 style="background:#000000; color:#FFD700;"| Non-conference games

|-
!colspan=8 style="background:#000000; color:#FFD700;"| Conference games

|-
!colspan=8 style="background:#000000; color:#FFD700;"| SWAC tournament

|-
!colspan=8 style="background:#000000; color:#FFD700;"| CIT

References

Alabama State
Alabama State Hornets basketball seasons
Alabama State
Alabama State Horn
Alabama State Horn